Roumegueria is a genus of fungi in the class Dothideomycetes. The relationship of this taxon to other taxa within the class is unknown (incertae sedis). This is a monotypic genus, containing the single species Roumegueria goudotii.

See also 
 List of Dothideomycetes genera incertae sedis

References

External links 
 Roumegueria at Index Fungorum

Dothideomycetes enigmatic taxa
Monotypic Dothideomycetes genera
Taxa named by Pier Andrea Saccardo